David Accam (born 28 September 1990) is a Ghanaian professional footballer who plays as a winger for Finnish club Inter Turku. He has won 11 caps for the Ghana national team.

Club career

Ghana
Accam did not belong to a club during the first twelve years of his life. He instead spent his time playing with friends on gravel pitches in the parks of Accra. There, he was spotted by a scout from Ghana-based Right to Dream Academy, where he would spend four years.

England
In 2008, Accam received a three-year scholarship to study at Hartpury College in England. He combined his time there with playing in the English lower leagues. After signing for English club Ledbury Town, Accam scored on his debut in December 2009. He then played for English club Evesham United during the 2010–11 season while also featuring in the reserve team squad at Forest Green Rovers. The fact that Accam was in England on a student visa prevented him from playing for their first team, or any club in a higher division.

After his time at Evesham United he took part in the Nike "The Chance" competition where he was one of eight winners who got to spend the 2011–2012 season with Nike Football Academy.

Sweden

In March 2012, Accam signed for Swedish third tier side Östersund. English manager Graham Potter was in charge of the club and he had already signed two other Ghanaians who were studying with Accam at Hartpury College. And after scouting him at the Nike Academy he brought Accam with him back to Sweden. Accam became an immediate success with his new team and several Allsvenskan clubs became interested in signing him for the summer transfer window.

Accam was then signed by Allsvenskan club Helsingborg in August 2012, and was due to be loaned back to Östersund for the remainder of the season, but was recalled by Helsingborg for an upcoming Champions League qualifying match against Celtic. The 2 million SEK transfer fee paid by Helsingborg was the highest ever for a player from the Swedish third tier.

After scoring seventeen goals in twenty-six appearances, the club announced that Accam would be leaving Helsingborg to pursue opportunities elsewhere. After he made the announcement, Accam was linked with a move away from Tigres, Eintracht Frankfurt and VfB Stuttgart, a number of English clubs and CSKA Moscow. Accam rejected a move to CSKA Moscow, having insisted that Accam hadn't been in talks with the club.

Major League Soccer
Despite initially denying the move, Accam signed as a designated player with Chicago Fire of Major League Soccer on 19 December 2014.

After three seasons with Chicago, on 19 January 2018 Accam was traded to Philadelphia Union in exchange for $900,000 in Targeted Allocation Money and $300,000 in General Allocation Money. In Accam's first season with Philadelphia, he was hampered by injuries and recorded just one goal in 23 appearances. His form picked up in his second season, scoring 4 goals with 2 assists in 11 games, however, he was traded to Columbus Crew SC on 8 May 2019. On 16 May, it was announced that Accam would be traded to Nashville SC, effective 1 January 2020, and would play out the 2019 season with the Crew.

Following the 2021 season and his loan with Hammarby, Accam's contract option was declined by Nashville and he became a free agent.

Return to Sweden
On 28 January 2021, Accam joined Swedish side Hammarby IF on a 12-month loan with an option to transfer. He made his competitive debut for the side on 1 April against Trelleborgs FF in the quarter-final of the Svenska Cupen, the main domestic cup. His side won 3–2 after extra time, with Accam coming on as a substitute and scoring in his debut. On 30 May 2021, Accam won the 2020–21 Svenska Cupen with Hammarby IF, through a 5–4 win on penalties (0–0 after full-time) against BK Häcken in the final, where he scored his attempt. At the end of the year, it was announced that Accam would leave the club at the expiration of his loan deal.

Finland 
In August 2022, Accam signed with Finnish side Inter Turku on a 4-month contract, with an option to extend it for an additional year.

International career

Accam received his first call-up to the Ghana national team for a 2014 World Cup qualification match against Sudan on 24 March 2013, in which he was an unused substitute.

On 12 May 2014, Accam was named in a provisional 26-man squad in the 2014 World Cup by Ghana manager James Kwesi Appiah. However, on 2 June 2014, Accam was left out of the World Cup squad. Accam expressed his disappointment of being dropped for the World Cup squad.

On 15 November 2014, Accam made his international debut for Ghana in a 1–0 defeat to Uganda in a 2015 Africa Cup of Nations qualifier, coming on as a 67th-minute substitute for Christian Atsu.
 
He was selected as part of Ghana's preliminary squad for the 2015 Africa Cup of Nations.

Personal life
Accam received his U.S. green card in October 2015 which qualifies him as a domestic player for MLS roster purposes.

Accam is a lifelong Arsenal fan and is a devout Christian. He married Ghanaian women's international footballer Florence Dadson on 3 January 2019 in Cape Coast, Ghana.

Career statistics

Club

International

Honours
Hammarby IF
 Svenska Cupen: 2020–21

References

External links

 
 

Living people
1990 births
Ghanaian Christians
Ghanaian footballers
Footballers from Accra
Association football wingers
Right to Dream Academy players
Ledbury Town F.C. players
Evesham United F.C. players
Forest Green Rovers F.C. players
Nike Academy players
Östersunds FK players
Helsingborgs IF players
Chicago Fire FC players
Philadelphia Union players
Columbus Crew players
Nashville SC players
Hammarby Fotboll players
Southern Football League players
Ettan Fotboll players
Allsvenskan players
Major League Soccer players
Ghana international footballers
2015 Africa Cup of Nations players
Ghanaian expatriate footballers
Expatriate footballers in England
Ghanaian expatriate sportspeople in England
Expatriate footballers in Sweden
Ghanaian expatriate sportspeople in Sweden
Expatriate soccer players in the United States
Ghanaian expatriate sportspeople in the United States
Designated Players (MLS)